Myittha may refer to many places in Myanmar:

Myittha, Mandalay Region, in Myittha Township, Mandalay Region
Myittha, Kalewa, Sagaing Region
Myittha, Myaung, Sagaing Region
Myittha, Ngazun, Sagaing Region
Myittha, Monyo, Bago Region
Myittha River

See also
Myitta